The Perfect Sap is a 1927 American comedy film directed by Howard Higgin. It is based on the 1926 play Not Herbert by Howard Irving Young. The film stars Ben Lyon, Pauline Starke, Virginia Lee Corbin, Lloyd Whitlock, Diana Kane, Byron Douglas and Christine Compton. The film was released on January 23, 1927, by First National Pictures.

Cast       
Ben Lyon as Herbert Alden
Pauline Starke as Polly Stoddard
Virginia Lee Corbin as Ruth Webster
Lloyd Whitlock as Tracy Sutton
Diana Kane as Roberta Alden
Byron Douglas as Stephen Alden
Christine Compton as Mrs. Stephen Alden
Charles Craig as Fletcher
Sam Hardy as Nick Fanshaw
Tammany Young as George Barrow
Helen Rowland as Cissie Alden

References

External links
 

1927 films
1920s English-language films
Silent American comedy films
1927 comedy films
First National Pictures films
Films directed by Howard Higgin
American silent feature films
American black-and-white films
American films based on plays
1920s American films